Joakim Ryan (born June 17, 1993) is an American-Swedish professional ice hockey defenseman. He is currently playing for the Malmö Redhawks of the Swedish Hockey League (SHL). He was selected by the San Jose Sharks in the seventh round (198th overall) of the 2012 NHL Entry Draft.

Playing career
Raised in Rumson, New Jersey, Ryan played high school hockey at Christian Brothers Academy in Lincroft, New Jersey.

Ryan played collegiate hockey for the NCAA Division I Cornell Big Red men's ice hockey team which competes in the ECAC Hockey conference. In his junior year, Ryan's outstanding play was rewarded with a selection to the 2013–14 All-Ivy League First Team.

At the completion of his senior season, Ryan was signed an entry-level contract with the San Jose Sharks on March 26, 2015. He was then assigned to then AHL affiliate, the Worcester Sharks, to complete the 2014–15 season.

He signed a new two-year contract extension with the Sharks on June 19, 2017. He was recalled from the AHL on December 22, 2017, and he scored his first two NHL goals in a 6–4 victory against the Edmonton Oilers on February 10, 2018. He made his Stanley Cup playoffs debut on May 2, 2018, in a 4–0 win over the Vegas Golden Knights. The Sharks ended up losing to the Knights in six games.

On July 1, 2019, Ryan signed as a free agent to a one-year, $725,000 contract with the Los Angeles Kings. In the 2019–20 season with the Kings, Ryan used in a depth defensive role appeared in 35 games scoring one goal and adding four assists.

A free agent after his lone season with the Kings, during the COVID-19 adjusted off-season, Ryan signed a one-year, two-way contract with the Carolina Hurricanes on October 12, 2020. In the pandemic delayed 2020–21 season, Ryan was a part of the club's extended roster on the taxi squad, before he was assigned to AHL affiliate, the Chicago Wolves. After 4 games with the Wolves, Ryan returned to the Hurricanes, making his debut with the club on April 22, 2021, against the Florida Panthers. He finished the season having played in just 4 games with the Hurricanes, going scoreless.

As an impending free agent, Ryan halted his NHL career by opting to sign a contract in Sweden with former youth club, Malmö Redhawks of the SHL, on June 11, 2021.

Personal life
Ryan is the son of former professional tennis player Catarina Lindqvist and Bill Ryan, who played lacrosse at the University of New Hampshire. Ryan grew up as a New York Rangers fan and spent two years living in Sweden from 2003 to 2005 where he was a top ranked tennis player. While in high school at Christian Brothers, Ryan was also a standout lacrosse player, finishing his career with 153 goals and 222 points, which, at his time of graduation, placed him second and fifth on CBA's all time lists respectively.

Career statistics

Regular season and playoffs

International

Awards and honors

References

External links

1993 births
Living people
American men's ice hockey defensemen
American people of Swedish descent
Carolina Hurricanes players
Chicago Wolves players
Christian Brothers Academy (New Jersey) alumni
Cornell Big Red men's ice hockey players
Dubuque Fighting Saints players
Ice hockey players from New Jersey
Los Angeles Kings players
Malmö Redhawks players
People from Rumson, New Jersey
San Jose Barracuda players
San Jose Sharks draft picks
San Jose Sharks players
Sportspeople from Monmouth County, New Jersey
Swedish expatriate ice hockey players in the United States
Swedish ice hockey players
Worcester Sharks players